Daniel Suarez (born December 21, 1964) is a former American information technology consultant turned author. He initially published under the pseudonym Leinad Zeraus (his name spelled backwards).

Career
His career as an author began with a pair of techno-thriller novels. The first novel, Daemon, was self-published under his own company, Verdugo Press, in late 2006. It was later picked up by the major publishing house Dutton and re-released on January 8, 2009. His follow-up book Freedom™ was released on January 7, 2010. The Wall Street Journal has reported that Walter F. Parkes, who produced the 1983 film WarGames, had optioned the film rights to Daemon with Paramount Pictures in 2009, but the rights likely reverted to Suarez on 8 December 2012.

Suarez announced in November 2011 that he was writing his third novel, "which deals with autonomous drones and next-gen, anonymous warfare" (via his Google Plus Account). That novel, Kill Decision, was released on July 19, 2012. His next book, Influx, was released on February 20, 2014. Influx won the 2015 Prometheus Award.  His fifth book, Change Agent, was released on April 18, 2017 and uses CRISPR as its theme. His most recent novel, Critical Mass (2023), deals with the near future effects of asteroid mining and the privatization of space, and is the second part of a trilogy that started with Delta-V.

Literary works
 
 
 
 Influx (2014) 
 
The ship propels itself on a low delta-v trajectory of just a couple of months to intercept the near-Earth asteroid Ryugu, where it is to spend four years mining. Challenges and drama ensue.
 Critical Mass. (2023) New York: Dutton. ISBN 9780593183632

References

External links 

 
 
 

1964 births
Living people
American thriller writers
American male novelists
21st-century American novelists
21st-century American male writers
American Noir writers